was a Japanese screenwriter noted for his immense contributions to several films by Ishirō Honda, including several classic Godzilla films. He also contributed material to the original Ultraman series and several Tōei Dōga films such as Gulliver's Travels Beyond the Moon and Jack and the Witch.

His very first screenplay was for the independently produced film (though distributed by Shintoho Studios) Fearful Attack of the Flying Saucers, which was also his sole directing credit.

His scripts for kaiju films have been noted for their inventiveness and for having a more lightweight, "fun" tone than those written by Takeshi Kimura (aka Kaoru Mabuchi), another leading writer of kaiju films, whose scripts had a darker, more serious sensibility. 

Before embarking on his screenwriting career, he briefly attended an animation school with famed manga artist and animator Osamu Tezuka.

Partial filmography
Note: The films listed as N/A are not necessarily chronological.

References 
Citations

Bibliography

External links
 
 

1921 births
1992 deaths
Anime screenwriters
People from Kyoto
20th-century Japanese screenwriters